One Way of Life is a "Best of" compilation by the Levellers, released in 1998 on China Records.

Track listing
 "One Way" (New Version)
 "What a Beautiful Day" 
 "Fifteen Years"
 "Shadow on the Sun"
 "Hope St." (New Mix)
 "Belaruse" (New Mix)
 "Celebrate"
 "Too Real" (Single Version, 12")
 "Bozos"
 "This Garden" (Single Version)
 "Carry Me" (New Version)
 "Fantasy"
 "Julie" (Single Version)
 "Dog Train" (Single Version)
 "Far From Home" (Single Version)
 "Just the One" (Single Version)

Personnel

Musicians
 Mark Chadwick - guitars, vocals
 Charlie Heather - drums/percussion
 Jeremy Cunningham - bass guitar, artwork
 Simon Friend - guitars, vocals, mandolin
 Jonathan Sevink - fiddle

Levellers (band) albums
1998 compilation albums
China Records compilation albums